Vestsjællands Lokalbaner A/S (literally The Local Railways of West Zealand, abbreviated VL) was a Danish railway company. It existed from 2003 to 2009.

History

A merger of Odsherreds Jernbane A/S (OHJ) and Høng-Tølløse Jernbane A/S (HTJ), VL was established in May 2003 after several years of close cooperation between the two companies. The company operated the former OHJ and HTJ lines, that is, Holbæk–Nykøbing Sjælland and Tølløse–Slagelse, respectively. The company workshop and headquarters were located in Holbæk.

The company was merged with Lollandsbanen A/S and Østbanen into a new company, Regionstog A/S, on 1 January 2009. Regionstog A/S merged again with Lokalbanen A/S in 2015 to form the railway company Lokaltog A/S.

See also
 Lokaltog
 Rail transport in Denmark

References

External links
 Lokaltog
 
 
 Interactive Panorama inside the new VL Lint trainset ( Flash)

Railway companies established in 2003
Railway companies disestablished in 2009
Defunct railway companies of Denmark